Lyfe  may refer to:

Lyfe (EP), an extended play by American rapper Yeat
DJ Lyfe, former turntablist and co-songwriter of the band Incubus
Lyfe Jennings, an American R&B and soul singer-songwriter, record producer, and instrumentalist
Lyfe (food company), an American restaurant and grocery foods company